This is a list of episodes for the television series Kojak.

The first five seasons (Pilot + 118 ep.) were aired on CBS from 1973 until 1978. CBS also commissioned a pair of TV movies in 1985 and 1987. ABC revived Kojak in 1989 for five additional TV movies, the last of which aired in 1990.

Series overview

Episodes

Pilot movie (1973)

Season 1 (1973–74)

Season 2 (1974–75)

Season 3 (1975–76)

Season 4 (1976–77)

Season 5 (1977–78)

TV movies (1985–90)

References

External links
 

Kojak
Episodes